The Airco DH.9 (from de Havilland 9) – also known after 1920 as the de Havilland DH.9 – was a British single-engined biplane bomber developed and deployed during the First World War.

The DH.9 was a development of Airco's earlier successful DH.4, with which it shared many components. These were mated to an all-new fuselage and the BHP/Galloway Adriatic engine, which promised increased performance. Anticipating its usefulness, the type was ordered in very large numbers for Britain's Royal Flying Corps (RFC).

Upon entering service, the DH.9's performance was found to be unsatisfactory. The Adriatic engine was unreliable and failed to provide the expected power, which gave the DH.9 poorer performance than the aircraft it had been meant to replace. The performance deficit was blamed for the heavy losses they suffered over the Western Front. The redesigned DH.9A was fitted with a more powerful and reliable American Liberty L-12 engine which rectified the shortcomings of the original DH.9 model.

Development

Origins
During June 1917, partially as a result of attacks by German bombers on London, the War Office issued its recommendation to almost double the size of the Royal Flying Corps (RFC) to a total of 200 squadrons. In early July 1917, the British Cabinet accepted the recommendation, with the intention that the majority of the new squadrons planned to be equipped with bombers. While an order for 700 DH.4s was placed on 28 June 1917, on 23 July 1917, the Air Board were presented with drawings for a modified DH.4 that delivering greater range under a new type number, DH.9.

The DH.9 was designed by de Havilland for the Aircraft Manufacturing Company in 1916 as a successor to the DH.4. It used the wings and tail unit of the DH.4 but featured a modified fuselage which moved the pilot closer to the gunner/observer and away from the engine and fuel tank, which facilitated communication and was a more optimal fighting configuration. The other major change from the DH.4 was the choice of the promising new BHP/Galloway Adriatic engine, which was predicted to produce  to provide adequate performance to match enemy fighters.

Based on the performance estimates for the DH.9 (which were initially expected to surpass those of the DH.4), and the similarity to the DH.4, which meant that it would be easy to convert production over to the new aircraft, it was decided to place a massive number of orders (totalling 4,630 aircraft) for the type prior to the aircraft even flying for the first time. Existing contracts originally placed for the DH.4 were also converted to the DH.9. The Air Board had been specifically assured that there would be an initial production delay of no more than a month. According to aviation author J.M Bruce, the selection of the DH.9 "seems to have been taken in a spirit of optimism or blind faith, for its chosen engine was, in July 1917, experiencing serious manufacturing difficulties".

Into flight
In July 1917, the prototype (a converted DH.4) performed its maiden flight from Hendon Aerodrome, Colindale, London. Trials of the type were extensive, including a number of tests performed at RAF Martlesham Heath. This deficit had a drastic effect on the aircraft's performance, especially at high altitude, with it being inferior to that of the DH.4 it was supposed to replace.

The poor performance of the aircraft meant that the DH.9 would have to fight its way through enemy fighters, which could easily catch the DH.9 where the DH.4 could avoid many of these attacks. As early as November 1917, some officials, such as General Hugh Trenchard, raised repeated objections to the aircraft based upon its disappointing performance; however, in his response, President of the Air Council Sir William Weir started that "it was the choice of having the DH.9 with the B.H.P. engine, or of having nothing at all. Additionally, by this point, production of the DH.9 was already well underway.

Multiple attempts were made to provide the DH.9 with an adequate engine; a number of aircraft were powered by the Siddeley Puma, a lightened and supposedly more powerful version of the BHP. In August 1917, an order for 2,000 Fiat A12 engines was placed, intending to be delivered between January and June 1918 and used upon some production batches of the D.H9; however, deliveries of the Fiat engine were unsatisfactory.

However, none of these options were deemed to be entirely satisfactory, it required being redesigned into the DH.9A, for which an American V-12 Liberty engine was adopted, to transform the aircraft. According to Bruce, aside from the engine issue: "Certainly, there was little wrong with the aircraft itself".

Design
The Airco DH.9 was a single-engine British bomber aircraft, sharing a high level of similarities with the preceding DH.4. The standard flight surfaces were broadly the same, but adopted a highly redesigned fuselage configuration, including the repositioning of the pilot's cockpit to a more rearwards position. Structurally, the fuselage was similar to its predecessor; plywood cladding covered the forward fuselage, which had no internal bracing, while a conventional wire-braced box girder structure was used aft of the cockpits.

While the DH.9 was deemed to be suitable for daytime bombing operations, it was found to be incapable of effective nighttime bombing due to the pilot's view being obstructed and visibility via the bombsight being unsuitable. The revised cockpit positioning of the DH.9 from the DH.4 placed the pilot and the observer closer together, which was viewed by the RAF as being a considerable advantage in aerial combat; however, the pilot's visibility for ground reconnaissance was decreased as a result. Both radio sets and cameras could be installed. The fuel tanks were enclosed in doped fabric, intended to drain fuel away if the tanks were hit by enemy fire. According to the testing squadron, the DH.9 possessed a high level of manoeuvrability, was relatively easy to perform landings aside from a poor view during the approach.

Various improvements and supplementary equipment were trialled and occasionally adopted. Tests of various engines, radiators, silencers and parachutes were conducted to evaluate their performance, however, few of these improvements were ultimately adopted. During the war, numerous customisations and improvised improvements were made to the aircraft by the maintenance crews of individual squadrons, often for the purpose of addressing the type's engine performance issues. After the end of the war, many DH.9s, which had been originally delivered as bombers, were sold; these were often reconfigured to serve in different roles, including passenger and cargo transport, trainer aircraft, and as air ambulances.

Operational history

First World War service
To boost the rate of production, quantity orders for the DH.9 were also placed with Alliance, G & J.Weir, Short Brothers, Vulcan, Waring & Gillow and National Aircraft Factories No. 1 and No. 2. The first deliveries of the type occurred during November 1917 to 108 Squadron RFC; by the end of 1917, a total of five DH.9s had been delivered and passed their final inspections. The first combat engagement of the type, performed over France, was performed in March 1918 by No. 6 Squadron RNAS. By July 1918, a total of nine operational squadrons deployed to the Western Front were using the type.

The DH.9's performance in action over the Western Front was typically deemed to have been a disaster; heavy losses of the type were quickly incurred, attributed to both its poor performance and to engine failures, despite the prior derating of its engine to reduce the failure rate. Between May and November 1918, a pair of squadrons stationed at the Western Front (Nos. 99 and 104) had 54 of its DH.9s shot down and another 94 aircraft written off due to accidents. On multiple occasions, less than half of a flight of bombers would reach their intended targets; according to Bruce, the successful missions performed by the DH.9 were frequently a product of "the courage and determination of the pilots and observers that flew them". Squadrons would often implement their own home-built enhancements to their aircraft, such as enlarged carburetor air intakes and modified fuel mixture controls.

Nevertheless, the type proved capable during some engagements; on 23 August 1918, a DH.9 flown by Lieutenant Arthur Rowe Spurling of 49 Squadron, with his observer, Sergeant Frank Bell, single-handedly attacked thirty Fokker D.VII fighters, downing five of them. On 9 August 1918, Lieutenant E.A. Simpson of 49 Squadron, while flying a bombing mission upon bridges at Falvy and Bethencourt, shot down four hostile fighters while defending against repeated attacks upon the formation. In another instance, Captain John Stevenson Stubbs achieved 11 aerial victories in a DH.9, including the highly unusual feat of balloon busting while flying the type.

Despite its general lack of performance, due to its large numbers, the DH.9 was introduced to nearly every theatre of the conflict prior to the signing of the Armistice of 11 November 1918, which ended the conflict. Reportedly, the DH.9 was also more successful in combat against the Turkish forces in the Middle East, where they faced less aerial opposition. Stationed at coastal aerodromes across the British mainland, the type was also used extensively to perform coastal patrol missions with the aim of deterring the operations of enemy U-boats.

Post war service
Following the end of the First World War, a number of DH.9s operated by 47 Squadron and 221 Squadron were sent to southern Russia in 1919 in support of the White Russian Army of General Denikin, participating in the Russian Civil War. In this theatre, the aircraft were often operating within challenging conditions.

The last combat use of the DH.9 by the RAF was in support of the final campaign against Diiriye Guure in Somalia during January–February 1920. Amongst those aircraft used in Somalia, one DH.9 was modified to function as an air ambulance, being able to load and transport a single stretcher case, which was carried upon the upper longerons directly to the rear of the pilot's cockpit. Further ambulance conversions were performed, including a number that were operated by the Royal Netherlands Air Force.

Surprisingly, production was allowed to continue after the end of the war into 1919. In 1920, the DH.9 was finally withdrawn from service by the RAF. In addition to British manufacturing, several other countries had commenced production of the type; perhaps the most significant of these was the Airco DH.9A, which was fitted with the American V-12 Liberty engine, and was produced in the thousands even though production was curtailed by the signing of the Armistice that had ended the First World War. Belgium and Spain also produced the type, the latter producing hundreds of the type equipped with a  Hispano-Suiza engine; some of these were still in service in 1940.

Following the end of the conflict, large numbers of surplus DH.9s became available at low prices and the type was widely exported; this included those aircraft that were donated to the Dominions as well as India as part of the Imperial Gift programme. The South African Air Force (SAAF) received a total of 48 DH.9s, and used them extensively, including against the Rand Revolt in 1922. Several South African aircraft were later re-engined with Bristol Jupiter radial engines as the M′pala; such modified aircraft continued to serve until 1937. One DH.9 was transported to Japan during the Sempill Mission. A large number of DH.9s were also apparently exported to China according to the ADC Aircraft.

Possibly the last battle use by any user was in late 1922, during the Turkish War of Independence. Greeks had deployed a number of them against the Kemalists who were fighting the British supported Greek Army invading the remaining chunk of the Ottoman Empire after the 1918 Armistice of Mudros followed by the Sevres Treaty which was rejected by the nationalists. One of Greek DH.9s had made a forced landing behind Turkish lines near Muğla during the Battle of Sakarya previous year, sometime in July 1921. This machine was quickly repaired and was flown to Ankara in August 1921 by famous pilot Vecihi Hürkuş. It was named "Ismet". It was deployed, as the only Turkish airplane at the time, in the last phases of the Battle of Sakarya, making a total of 23 sorties, mostly by Vecihi. Same airplane continued to serve for the remaining of the War of Independence through 1922. There were three more Greek DH.9s found in excellent condition, with plenty of spare parts, near Izmir after the Greek army pulled out hurriedly, having been routed by Kemalists in August 1922. These four planes served the young Turkish Air Force until 1925.

Civilian service

After the end of the war, large numbers of surplus DH.9s became available, having been deemed to be surplus to requirements by their original military operators; accordingly, many were resold onto civil operators, such as by early aerial transport companies. Large numbers were modified to better perform as transport aircraft, such as the cabin being suitably adapted for the carriage of passengers. In this role, the DH.9 provided a useful load carrying capability and was relatively inexpensive to procure. Accordingly, in various configurations, the type saw prolific use by civil operators.

Early air services between London, Paris and Amsterdam were operated by a fleet of DH.9s owned by Aircraft Transport and Travel. A number of DH9s were converted into floatplanes and saw use in India, Bolivia and Rhodesia. Several aircraft were reconfigured to serve as trainer aircraft, being refitted with Armstrong Siddeley Jaguar engines and rubber undercarriages; designated as DH.9Js, the last of these were withdrawn and scrapped in 1936.

A number of different DH.9 conversion programmes for civil use were carried out, both by Airco and its successor, the de Havilland Aircraft Company, and by other third party companies, such as the Aircraft Disposal Company. Some radial powered DH.9Js continued in civil use until 1936. One Dh.9 was transported to Japan during the Sempill Mission.  A large number of Dh.9s were also apparently exported to China according to the Aircraft Disposal Company.

Variants
DH.9 – Revised version of the DH.4 with the pilot and observer/gunner placed closer together (3,024 production aircraft built with others built in Belgium and Spain).
DH.9A – (also referred to as the Nine-Ack) was designed for Airco by Westland Aircraft to take advantage of the  American Liberty L-12 engine. Apart from the new engine and slightly larger wings it was identical to the DH.9. Initially it was hoped to quickly replace the DH.9 with the new version, but the shortage of Liberty engines available to the RAF limited the new type's service in the First World War, and it is best known as a standard type in the postwar RAF, serving as a general purpose aircraft for several years. 2,300 DH.9As were built by ten different British companies.
DH.9B – Conversions for civilian use as three-seaters (one pilot and two passengers)
DH.9C – Conversions for civilian use as four-seaters (one pilot and three passengers)
DH.9J – Modernised and re-engined conversions using the  Armstrong Siddeley Jaguar III radial engine. Used by the De Havilland School of Flying.

DH.9J M'pala I – Re-engined conversions carried out by the South African Air Force. Powered by a  Bristol Jupiter VI radial piston engine.
M'pala II – Re-engined conversions carried out by the South African Air Force, powered by a  Bristol Jupiter VIII radial piston engine.
Mantis – Re-engined conversions carried out by the South African Air Force, powered by a  Wolseley Viper piston engine.
Handley Page HP.17 – A DH.9 experimentally fitted with slotted wings, tested 1920–1.
USD-9/9A – DH.9s manufactured in the United States by the US Army's Engineering Division and Dayton-Wright. (1,415 ordered, only four built)

Operators

Military operators

Afghan Air Force – 18 aircraft, including 16 built by Duks Aircraft Works, acquired from 1924.

Royal Australian Air Force – One used by the RAAF from 1920 to 1929.
No. 1 Flying Training School RAAF

Belgian Air Force – 18 aircraft.

Canadian Air Force

Bolivian Air Force

Chilean Air Force – Received 20.

Estonian Air Force operated 13 from 1919 to 1933 .

(Part of Imperial Gift)

Royal Hellenic Naval Air Service

Hejaz Air Force – The Kingdom of Hejaz received 9 DH.9s and 2 DH.9Cs between 1921 and 1924. Five remained in existence (although not airworthy) in 1932.

Irish Air Service
Irish Air Corps

Latvian Air Force

Royal Netherlands East Indies Army Air Force – operated 36, some of which were re-engined with Pratt & Whitney Wasp radial engine withdrawn in 1934.

Royal New Zealand Air Force – Three Airco DH.9s in service with the New Zealand Permanent Air Force from 1923 to 1929 as advanced training aircraft.

Paraguayan Air Force

Peruvian Air Force

Polish Air Force – 20 received in 1920, used during the Polish-Soviet war, until 1929.

Royal Romanian Air Force
 Kingdom of Spain
Spanish Air Force

South African Air Force – Part of the Imperial Gift. Some locally modified with Jupiter engines and named Mpala.

Soviet Air Force

Swiss Air Force

Turkish Air Force – four aircraft, in service from 1921 to 1924.

Royal Flying Corps
Royal Naval Air Service
Royal Air Force

American Expeditionary Force
United States Marine Corps

Uruguayan Air Force

Civil operators

Qantas

Sabena
SNETA

Det Danske Luftfartselskab

KLM

SNNA
 Kingdom of Spain
Cia Espanola del Trafico Aereo

Aircraft Transport and Travel
Handley Page Transport
  Bikaner State
 Maharaja Ganga Singh

Surviving aircraft

Of the thousands of DH.9s built, only a few survived to be preserved:
 F1258 is displayed at the Musée de l'Air et de l'Espace in Paris,
 An original DH.9 is displayed without serial number at the South African National Museum of Military History. This DH.9 flew with the South African Air Force after World War I, then was operated as a civilian aircraft as ZS-AOI, before returning to the SAAF.
 G-EAQM (original RAF serial F1278) was the first single-engined aircraft to fly from the United Kingdom to Australia and is preserved at the Australian War Memorial in Canberra.

In 2000, the remains of three DH.9s were discovered in India and two were retrieved for restoration in the UK. Of these,
 D5649 was restored and is displayed at the Imperial War Museum, Duxford.
 E8894/G-CDLI was restored to airworthy condition and is operated as a warbird by the Historic Aircraft Company in England.
 The third was retained in India and restored to a somewhat less-than-faithful condition for display at Junargh Fort in the city of Bikaner, Rajasthan.

Specifications (DH.9 (Puma Engine))

See also

References

Notes

Bibliography
 Andersson, Lennart. "Wings Over the Desert: Aviation on the Arabian Peninsula: Part One Saudi Arabia". Air Enthusiast, No. 112, July/August 2004. pp. 39–43. ISSN 0143-5450.
 Barnes, C.H. Handley Page Aircraft since 1907. London:Putnam, 1976. .
 Bruce, J. M. "Aircraft Profile No. 62: The de Havilland D.H.9". Profile Publications Ltd, 1965.
 Bruce, J.M. "The De Havilland D.H.9: Historic Military Aircraft: No. 12, Part I". Flight, 6 April 1956. Pages 385–388, 392.
 Bruce, J.M. "The De Havilland D.H.9: Historic Military Aircraft: No. 12, Part II". Flight, 13 April 1956. Pages 422–426.

 Gerdessen, Frederik. "Estonian Air Power 1918 – 1945". Air Enthusiast, No. 18, April – July 1982. pp. 61–76. .
 Jackson, A.J. British Civil Aircraft since 1919 Volume 2. London:Putnam, Second edition 1973. .
 Jackson, A.J. De Havilland Aircraft since 1909. London: Putnam, Third edition 1987. .

 Mason, Francis K. The British Bomber Since 1914. London: Putnam Aeronautical Books, 1994. .
 Sturtivant, R. Page, g. "The DH.4/DH.9 File". Kent: Air-Britain (Historians) Ltd, 1999. .
 Thomas, Andrew. "In the Footsteps of Daedulus: Early Greek Naval Aviation". Air Enthusiast, No. 94, July–August 2001, pp. 8–9. 

 Winchester, Jim, ed. Bombers of the 20th Century. London: Airlife Publishing Ltd., 2003. .

External links

DH9 at Imperial War Museum, Duxford
AAirco D.H.9 – British Aircraft Directory

1910s British bomber aircraft
DH.009
Single-engined tractor aircraft
Biplanes
Aircraft first flown in 1917